Soundcity Radio Network is a Nigerian FM radio and nationwide digital radio station that follows a Top 40 music format and is owned by Alphavision Multimedia, a subsidiary of the Consolidated Media Associates (CMA). Headquartered in Lagos, Nigeria, Soundcity Radio Network broadcasts nationally to a youth audience.

Soundcity Radio Network music quota leans more to Nigerian music with over 70% of music played from local artists and 30% split between other African and Foreign music.

98.5 Lagos Launch 

Test transmissions for the first station for the Soundcity Radio Network, in Lagos, began in the first quarter of 2016, but programming and OAPs went on-air on 18 July. Other OAPs followed with four hour shifts each.

Coverage areas and frequencies 
Soundcity has transmitters serving these areas:

Notable current presenters

 Sheye Banks (What's Up Lagos)
 Moet Abebe (The TakeOver)
 Pearl Cardy (The WKND Central)
 Dj Kaywise (Thursday nights)
 Osato EDK (What's Up Abuja, Top 20 Nigeria)
 Blessing Imonikhe (Home Run ABJ)

References

External links

Radio stations in Nigeria
Radio stations in Lagos
Radio stations established in 2016